The men's 50 metre breaststroke competition of the swimming events at the 2011 World Aquatics Championships was held on July 26 with the heats and the semifinals and July 27 with the final.

Records
Prior to the competition, the existing world and championship records were as follows.

Results

Heats
51 swimmers participated in 7 heats.

Semifinals
The semifinals were held at 18:19.

Semifinal 1

Semifinal 2

Final
The final was held at 19:37.  Video replay shows Felipe França Silva using an illegal dolphin kick at the finish; however the official on deck did not see it and so the results stand.

References

External links
2011 World Aquatics Championships: Men's 50 metre breaststroke start list, from OmegaTiming.com; retrieved 2011-07-23.

Breaststroke 050 metre, men's
World Aquatics Championships